Chiluage is a town and commune of Angola, located in the province of Lunda Sul, adjacent to the border with the Democratic Republic of the Congo.

See also 

 Communes of Angola

References 

Populated places in Lunda Sul Province